Jean-Louis Nicolas Jaley (27 January 1802, Paris – 30 May 1866, Neuilly-sur-Seine)  was a French sculptor.

He was the pupil of his father Louis Jaley and Pierre Cartellier. In 1827, he won - together with François Lanno - the Prix de Rome for sculpture with a bas-relief Mucius Scævola devant Porsenna.

He was buried in the Père Lachaise Cemetery (49th division), near his father, who died in 1840.

Works
 La Prière (The Prayer), statue, marble, 1831, Paris, musée du Louvre
 La Pudeur (The Modesty), statue, marble, 1833, Paris, musée du Louvre
 Portrait du duc d'Orléans, statue, marble, 1842–1844, Paris, musée du Louvre
 allegorical figures of Vienna and London, Gare du Nord, Paris, circa 1864

References

Sources
 Emmanuel Schwartz, Les Sculptures de l'École des Beaux-Arts de Paris. Histoire, doctrines, catalogue, École nationale supérieure des Beaux-Arts, Paris, 2003
 Domenico Gabrielli, Dictionnaire Historique du cimetière du Père-Lachaise XVIIIème et XIXème siècles, L'Amateur editions, 2002

1802 births
1866 deaths
Burials at Père Lachaise Cemetery
Artists from Paris
Prix de Rome for sculpture
Members of the Académie des beaux-arts
19th-century French sculptors
French male sculptors
19th-century French male artists